Moutier railway station is a railway station in the municipality of Moutier, in the Swiss canton of Bern. It is an intermediate stop on the Basel–Biel/Bienne line and the terminus of the Solothurn–Moutier and Sonceboz-Sombeval–Moutier lines.

Services 
 the following services stop at Moutier:

 InterCity: hourly service over the Basel–Biel/Bienne line from Biel/Bienne to Basel SBB.
 RegioExpress: hourly service over the Basel–Biel/Bienne line from Biel/Bienne to Meroux (in France).
 Regio: hourly service (half-hourly on weekdays) over the Sonceboz-Sombeval–Moutier line to Sonceboz-Sombeval and hourly to Biel/Bienne.
 : hourly service over the Solothurn–Moutier line to Solothurn.

References

External links 
 
 

Railway stations in the canton of Bern
Swiss Federal Railways stations